The Indoor men's doubles competition at the 1912 Summer Olympics was part of the tennis program for the games.

Draw

Draw

References
 
 
  ITF, 2008 Olympic Tennis Event Media Guide

1912

Men's indoor doubles
Men's events at the 1912 Summer Olympics